WonderWorks is an entertainment center focused on science exhibits with six locations in the United States. Its buildings are commonly built as if they are upside down. 

The experience is considered "edutainment", a combination of education and entertainment. 

It contains numerous interactive exhibits through which guests can learn about various phenomena and experience them firsthand.

Description
Each WonderWorks location contains interactive entertainment exhibits on the themes of space, physics, and math. Some locations also offer a dinner magic show, as well as a 4D XD motion theater. Each WonderWorks building is designed to look as if an existing building was ripped free of the ground by severe weather and dropped upside down on its roof. This unique design is credited to the Orlando architect Terry O. Nichoson of Nichoson Design International, at WonderWorks' original Orlando location. Nichoson went on to serve as the main design consultant for all subsequent WonderWorks locations. 5 of the 6 locations offer laser tag and a multi-story ropes course. The Myrtle Beach location has an outdoor ropes course and zip-line, The Branson Location is the only location that doesn't have a ropes course. Most WonderWorks locations are open 365 days a year and it takes about 3–4 hours to tour each attraction.

The company has locations in Orlando, Florida (March 3, 1998); Pigeon Forge, Tennessee (2006); Panama City Beach, Florida (2009); Myrtle Beach, South Carolina(Located in the Broadway at the Beach shopping mall) (2011); Syracuse, New York (located inside of Destiny USA) (2012) and Branson, Missouri (2020).

The exterior of WonderWorks museum is an upside-down building complete with upside down yard and decorations that continue to the inside of the museum.

Lore 
The lore of WonderWorks begins with the world's greatest scientists led by Professor Wonder. Their top-secret research laboratory located on a remote island in the Bermuda Triangle was the site for their latest experiment, creating a man-made tornado. The experiment goes wrong, and the tornado is unleashed into the laboratory, removing it from the ground and carrying it thousands of miles away until it lands upside down onto the current locations.

Lower Buildings  
Each location has the WonderWorks Lab on top of a random building 
Orlando, Florida: WarehousePigeon Forge, Tennessee: TheaterPanama City Beach, Florida: Surf ShackMyrtle Beach, South Carolina: Crab ShackSyracuse, New York: 3rd Floor of Destiny USABranson, Missouri: Log Cabin

Experiences

The WonderZones

Natural Disasters 
The natural disasters zone includes activities such as the Tesla Coil, Earthquake Cafe, Hurricane Shack, how cold is it? and Trivia Wall. During these experiences, guest can watch the tesla coil emit 100,000 volts of electricity, feel an earthquake with a magnitude of 5.3 on the Richter Scale, experience a hurricane wind of 74 miles per hour, hold their hands under 28 °F icy water, and answer trivia questions about weather and disasters.

Physical Challenge 
The physical challenge zone includes activities such as the Bed of Nails, Wonder Wall, Bubble Lab, Pulley Power and Virtual Sports. During these experiences, guests can lie down on 3500 nails, create 3-Dimensional images of their body on a gigantic pin wall, create bubbles big enough to fit inside, and pull themselves up using a rope and test their athletic skills.

Light and Sound 
The light and sound zone includes activities such as the Speed of Light, Recollections, Strike a Pose and Giant Piano. During these experiences, guests can test their speed and reflexes, watch their shadow multiply into different colors and patterns on a wall and jump from key to key on a giant piano.

Space Discovery 
The Space Discovery zone includes activities such as the Space suit, Mercury Capsule, Land the Shuttle, Astronaut Training Challenge and Wonder Coaster. During these experiences, guests can explore a life-sized replica of an EVA suit, climb into a replica of a launched capsule, maneuver the controls of a space shuttle, experience the feeling of weightlessness that astronauts feel when they are in space, and ride a roller coaster that they design themselves.

Imagination Lab 
The Imagination Lab zone includes activities such as the Wonder Brite, Alien Stomper, Fun Express, Gear Works, The Adventures of Professor Wonder, and Forensic Science Exhibition. During these experiences, guests can rearrange colored pegs to create shapes and patterns, play an alien game and send them back to outer space, work on digital painting or arrange gears until their teeth are interlocked to spin them around and explore the real work of a forensic scientist.

Far Out Art Gallery 
The Far-Out Art Gallery zone includes artwork of illusions that allows guests to explore the details of different paintings and try to find the hidden objects within them.

Pigeon Forge Bomb Threat 
In January 2021, the Pigeon Forge location was evacuated after a Bomb threat, a man from North Carolina brought two explosive devices and placed them by a tree in the wooded area. Bomb squad personnel were able to locate the two devices along with a box marked “explosive” from his van, according to Sevier County Sheriff’s Office.

Controversy 
In 2022, Multiple people filed complaints against WonderWorks in Orlando because One of the Elevators doesn't access the 2nd floor, 2 more complaints happened at the Branson location where a pipe burst on the 1st floor causing the whole floor to get flooded, and another time where the elevator stopped functioning.

Cancelled Film 
In 2015, The WonderWorks Company and Dreamworks Pictures announced plans to make a Family film based on the adventures of professor wonder, Raja Gosnell signed up as director and Jim Gaffigan as in talks to star as Professor Wonder, this project was cancelled for unknown reason and the rest of the project is lost.

Other Attractions  

 Indoor Ropes Course
 4D XD Motion Theater
 WonderWorks Laser Tag
 Outta Control Magic Comedy Dinner Show

References

External links

 

Museums in Orlando, Florida
Museums in Sevier County, Tennessee
Museums in Bay County, Florida
Science museums in Florida
Science museums in South Carolina
Science museums in Tennessee
Tourist attractions in Myrtle Beach, South Carolina
Tourist attractions in Rockland County, New York
Tourist attractions in Syracuse, New York
Pigeon Forge, Tennessee